Nawab Sirajuddaula is a 1967 Bengali language biographical film which details the life of Nawab of Bengal Siraj ud-Daulah (1733–1757) and the Battle of Plassey (1757). Khan Ataur Rahman was the director and screenwriter of the film.

Cast
 Anwar Hossain - Nawab Sirajuddaula
 Anwara Begum -  Aleya

Music
 Abdul Alim
 Abdul Jabbar
 Ferdausi Rahman
 Shahnaz Rahmatullah
 Shaheen Samad
 Sabina Yasmin

References

External links
 

1967 films
1960s historical films
1960s Bengali-language films
Bengali-language Pakistani films
Bangladeshi historical drama films
Bangladeshi films based on actual events